Trechus secalis is a species of ground beetle in the Trechinae subfamily. It is found in the Palearctic.

Subspecies
These two subspecies belong to the species Epaphius secalis:
 Epaphius secalis georgicus Jeannel, 1962
 Epaphius secalis secalis (Paykull, 1790)

References

Trechinae
Beetles described in 1790